Julia Rose Hart (born November 8, 2001) is an American professional wrestler and former cheerleader. She is currently making appearances in All Elite Wrestling (AEW) where she is a member of The House of Black stable.

Professional wrestling career 
Hart first began training at the Academy SOPW with Ken Anderson. On November 22, 2019, Hart had her debut match against Alyna Kyle, which Hart won. Hart then trained again with the 'Nightmare Factory', and on March 28, 2021 (on their second showcase), Hart took part in a tag match, teaming with Spencer Kitz to take on Hyena Hera and Karma Dean; the two lost the match.

Since May 2021, Hart began to work with All Elite Wrestling, appearing on AEW Dark or AEW Dynamite. She aligned with the team of the Varsity Blonds (Brian Pillman Jr. and Griff Garrison) for several months and was at ringside with them for each of their matches during that time. On the May 25 episode of AEW Dark Hart earned her first AEW win by pinning Tesha Price. On the September 4 episode of AEW Dark, Hart injured her leg, making her unable to compete in the Casino Battle Royale at All Out. Hart returned to the ring on the September 28 edition of AEW Dark (originally taped on September 11), where she faced Reka Tehaka and beat her by pinfall. On January 28 2022 special edition of Rampage being AEW Rampage Beach Break Hart faced Jade Cargill for the AEW TBS Championship which Hart lost. On April 6 on Dynamite Hart participated in the Owen Hart Cup where she lost to Hikaru Shida in the qualifying round.
On May 29 at Double or Nothing she joined The House of Black, turning heel in the process.

Personal life 
Hart is currently engaged to fellow AEW wrestler Lee Johnson.

Despite sharing the surname, she is not related to the Hart wrestling family.

Championships and accomplishments

Cheerleading
 National Cheerleading Championships (2 times)

References

External links
 

2001 births
All Elite Wrestling personnel
Living people
Sportspeople from Bloomington, Minnesota
American female professional wrestlers
Professional wrestlers from Minnesota
American cheerleaders
21st-century American women
21st-century professional wrestlers
The House of Black members